The Grey Horse Handicap is a flat handicap horse race in Great Britain open to grey horses aged three years or older. It is run over a distance of 6 furlongs (1,207 metres) on the July course at Newmarket in August.

History

The race was inaugurated in 2003 after Newmarket Racecourse director Peter Jensen saw a similar race at Flemington Racecourse, Melbourne, Australia. The race is the only race exclusively for grey horse in Great Britain. There was controversy in 2020 when two bay horses were entered for the race despite not meeting the requirement to be a grey horse. Their ineligibility was discovered at the five day entry stage.

Records
Most successful horse (2 wins):
 Middleton Grey - 2004, 2005
 Case Key – 2017, 2019

Leading jockey (2 wins):
 Ted Durcan – Compton's Eleven (2007), Syrian Pearl (2016)

Leading trainer (3 wins):
 Tony Newcombe - Middleton Grey (2004, 2005), Witchry (2010)

Winners
 Weights given in stones and pounds.

References

Flat races in Great Britain
Newmarket Racecourse
Recurring sporting events established in 2003
Open sprint category horse races